Vive may refer to:

Vive, Viva, a Romance language expression
Vive (José José album), 1974
Vive (Lucía Méndez album), 2004
Vive (a cappella group), a cappella group from England, United Kingdom
ViVe Televisión, a state-owned Venezuelan television channel
HTC Vive, virtual reality head-mounted display
Vive (software), members-only mobile video chat community
"Vive", the Spanish-language version of "Spirit" (Beyoncé song)